The Domus Sanctae Marthae (Latin for Saint Martha's House) is a building adjacent to St. Peter's Basilica in Vatican City. Completed in 1996, during the pontificate of Pope John Paul II, it is named after Martha of Bethany, who was a sibling to Mary and Lazarus of Bethany. The building functions as a guest house for clergy having business with the Holy See, and as the temporary residence of members of the College of Cardinals while participating in a papal conclave to elect a new pope.

Pope Francis has lived in a suite in the building since his election in March 2013, declining to use the papal apartments in the Apostolic Palace.

Building and facilities
Prior to the construction of Domus Sanctae Marthae, cardinals participating in conclaves lived in the Apostolic Palace, sleeping on cots in makeshift spaces throughout the palace, some within hallways and offices, often divided from one another by a sheet hanging on a rope. They shared common bathrooms, often with ten cardinals assigned to each.

Pope John Paul II, after participating in two conclaves, decided to make the process more comfortable and less strenuous on the elderly cardinals, and commissioned the construction of Domus Sanctæ Marthæ. He specified it would serve for conclaves and at other times be available to "ecclesiastical personnel serving at the Secretariat of State and, as far as possible, at other Dicasteries of the Roman Curia, as well as to cardinals and bishops visiting Vatican City to see the Pope or to participate in events and meetings organized by the Holy See." Laymen have stayed there as well.

Italian environmental groups, joined by Italian politicians, protested against the construction because it would block the view of St. Peter's Basilica enjoyed from some nearby apartments. The head of the Vatican's Department of Technical Services contended that it would be lower in height than many neighborhood buildings and rejected challenges to the Vatican's right to build within its borders.

The hotel cost $20 million, with $13 million initially pledged by Pittsburgh, Pennsylvania, casino owner John E. Connelly, who later received a contract to sell copies of Vatican art in the United States. Connelly did not fulfill his initial financial commitment after his business encountered financial setbacks. His art contract was also rescinded after he failed to extend his marketing efforts beyond Pittsburgh. Connelly proposed Louis D. Astorino, a Pittsburgh-based architect, to design the building. When his design was rejected, Astorino remained to design the adjacent Chapel of the Holy Spirit while the Italian architect Giuseppe Facchini, former deputy director of the technical services of the governorate of the Vatican, designed the new building. The chapel occupies a site between the Leonine Wall and the guesthouse proper.

The five-story building contains 106 suites, 22 single rooms and one apartment. It is run by the Daughters of Charity of Saint Vincent de Paul. Its amenities include furnished bedrooms, lavatories, and studies for each occupant. Dining facilities and personal services are also offered. Mary Ann Glendon, U.S. Ambassador to the Holy See from 2008 to 2009, described the accommodations as "comfortable, but by no means deluxe".

Previous structure
Pope Leo XIII had the St. Martha Hospice built in 1891, on the site now occupied by the Domus, when it was feared that the cholera epidemic of that time might reach Rome. After it did not, the building was used to provide services to the sick of Rome's Borgo and Trastevere neighborhoods and as a hospice for pilgrims. Electricity was provided in 1901, and a chapel added in 1902. Medical services expanded to cover priests and Swiss Guards. During World War II the building was used by refugees, Jews, and ambassadors from countries that had severed diplomatic relations with Italy. At the end of the war, Pope Pius XII greeted 800 Roman children who breakfasted at St. Martha Hospice after receiving their First Communion. It served as a home where senior clerics could live their last years. Increasingly it served as a residence for clerics assigned to Vatican offices.

Conclave use
Pope John Paul II's Apostolic Constitution Universi Dominici gregis of 22 February 1996 changed the rules governing papal conclaves to house the cardinal electors and certain staff at the Domus Sanctae Marthae and it has been used for the conclaves of 2005 and 2013. As at previous conclaves, the cardinal electors were assigned rooms by lot. All radios, television sets and telephones were disconnected, in accordance with regulations which call for the cardinals to be secluded from the outside world.

Papal residence

On 26 March 2013, the Vatican announced that Pope Francis would not move into the papal apartment in the Apostolic Palace. He is the first pope not to live in the Papal Apartments on the third floor of the Apostolic Palace since Pope Pius X occupied them in 1903. He uses the palace suite there as his office. He remained for a time in the room he was assigned by lot at the start of the conclave that elected him and then moved to Suite 201 of Domus Sanctae Marthae. He celebrates morning Mass and takes communal meals in the residence. Pope Francis explained his decision saying: "The residence in the Apostolic Palace is ... large and made with good taste, but not luxurious.... It is large, but the entrance is narrow. Only one person at a time can get in and I cannot live alone. I must live my life with others."

He occupies a bedroom furnished with basic necessities, a wooden standing Crucifix, along with a small statue of Our Lady of Luján, the Marian patroness of Argentina, Uruguay, and Paraguay. Outside his bedroom are two Pontifical Swiss Guards who work day and night shifts, and a statue of Saint Joseph under which the pontiff places prayer requests.

The Santa Marta Group, a Catholic leadership group combatting modern slavery, takes its name from the papal residence.

References

External links 
 

1996 establishments in Vatican City
Buildings and structures completed in 1996
Official residences in Vatican City
Properties of the Holy See
Residential buildings in Vatican City
Sites of papal elections